The Voyah Free is an all-electric and plug-in hybrid, 5-seater full-size crossover SUV manufactured by Voyah (岚图). The Voyah Free was put into production in the third quarter of 2021 for the Chinese market.

In late 2022, the Voyah Free (the Long Range all-electric model) was introduced in Norway.

Development 

The Voyah Free was originally previewed by the Voyah iFree concept car during the 2020 Beijing Auto Show in September 2020 by Voyah, a premium NEV brand by Dongfeng Motor. The production Free crossover was co-designed with Italdesign Giugiaro.

On 18 December 2020, Voyah Free, the first model of Voyah, was officially launched. The Voyah Free is available in two power combinations, extended range and pure electric.

The Voyah Free is built on the Dongfeng’s Electric Smart Secure Architecture (ESSA) platform. The suspension of the Free is a combination of front double wishbones and rear multi-links, and the chassis parts use all-aluminum subframes and connecting rods. Top of the trim models are equipped with air suspension, which will automatically lower when switching to the high energy driving mode. Nio is cooperating with Bosch.

The Voyah Free provides L2 advanced automatic driving assistance functions, featuring  wave radars as sensing hardwares. There vehicle is equipped with 9 cameras and 12 ultrasonic radars to perform driving assistance functions, including full speed adaptive cruise control, lane keeping assist, automatic braking, 360° panoramic image and blind spot monitoring. An effective active night vision system within  in front that identifies pedestrians and animals is also equipped.

Specifications 
The power of the Voyah Free extended range model comes from a 1.5-litre turbocharged 4-cylinder range extender and a  electric motor.

Voyah Free DNA 
Voyah Free DNA is a limited edition model based on the Voyah Free featuring even higher performance numbers and a special body kit.

See also 
 List of electric cars currently available

References 

Voyah Free
Cars introduced in 2020
Production electric cars
Crossover sport utility vehicles
Cars of China
Hybrid electric cars
Plug-in hybrid vehicles